During the 2001–02 English football season, Millwall competed in the First Division.

Season summary
Millwall finished fourth and qualified for the First Division play-offs, but were defeated by Birmingham City in the semi-final.

Final league table

Kit
Millwall's kit was manufactured by Strikeforce and sponsored by 24 Seven.

Players

First-team squad
Squad at end of season

Left club during season

Notes

References

Millwall F.C. seasons
Millwall